Neleus may refer to:
 Greek mythology:
 Neleus, son of the god Poseidon and Tyro
 , son of Codrus
 , a trojan asteroid of Jupiter, named after Neleus (son of Poseidon)
 Neleus of Scepsis, son of Coriscus of Scepsis, a disciple of Aristotle and Theophrastus
 Statue of Neleus, in the play ‘Mary Poppins’, Neleus comes alive in “Jolly Holiday” thus proving Mary Poppins is different and magical